Jeffrey J. Jillson (born July 24, 1980) is an American former professional ice hockey player who played in the National Hockey League for the San Jose Sharks, Boston Bruins and the Buffalo Sabres.

Playing career
Jillson was drafted 14th overall in the first round of the 1999 NHL Entry Draft by the San Jose Sharks.

Jillson played for Rhode Island high school power Mount Saint Charles Academy, before moving on to the University of Michigan. He signed with the Sharks at the conclusion of his junior season, but did not leave Michigan until he graduated from college with a business degree. He played in the American Hockey League for the Cleveland Barons before being called up to play for the Sharks.

The Sharks traded Jillson to the Boston Bruins during the 2002–03 season, along with Jeff Hackett, for defenseman Kyle McLaren. He spent most of his season playing for the Providence Bruins. At the trade deadline of the 2003–04 season, he was involved in a three-way trade among the Bruins, Sharks, and Sabres. Jillson was sent back to the Sharks for Brad Boyes, then to the Sabres for Curtis Brown and Andy Delmore. He spent most of his time in the Sabres organization with their AHL affiliate, the Rochester Americans. He played sparingly for the Sabres, but was inserted into their lineup during the 2006 Stanley Cup Playoffs to fill one of the holes on their blueline created by injuries to Dmitri Kalinin, Teppo Numminen, and Henrik Tallinder.

After spending a season in Germany's Deutsche Eishockey Liga, Jillson signed with the Colorado Avalanche as a free-agent in 2007, but spent the entire season in the AHL with the Lake Erie Monsters and never played for the Avalanche. In 2008, Jillson signed with HC MVD of the Kontinental Hockey League, was later released, and signed with Lukko of the Finnish SM-liiga.

On October 1, 2009, Jillson signed a one-year contract with HC Pardubice of the Czech Extraliga. After an unproductive second season with Pardubice, Jillson chose to remain in the Czech Republic, dropping down a league to the 1. národní hokejová liga to sign a two-year contract with KLH Chomutov on June 27, 2011. Jillson scored 12 points in 52 games to contribute to Chomutov's promotion to the Czech Extraliga, despite the success he left his contract and was released as a free agent on May 1, 2012.

In 140 regular-season NHL games (as of the end of the 2005–06 season), Jillson recorded 9 goals and 32 assists, totalling 41 points.

Personal
Jillson's younger brother, Nicholas, was killed in a house fire on February 6, 2010. In 2009, Jillson was the victim of a fraud case and was swindled out of $84,000 from the promises of motorcycle parts and a Mercedes. In July 2012, the conman was sentenced to 12 years imprisonment and as a result is now pursued in a civil case by Jillson.

Career statistics

Regular season and playoffs

International

Awards and honors

Jillson was inducted into the Rhode Island Hockey Hall of Fame in 2023.

References

External links

1980 births
American men's ice hockey defensemen
Boston Bruins players
Buffalo Sabres players
Cleveland Barons (2001–2006) players
Eisbären Berlin players
American expatriate ice hockey players in Russia
HC MVD players
HC Dynamo Pardubice players
Ice hockey players from Rhode Island
Lake Erie Monsters players
Living people
Lukko players
Michigan Wolverines men's ice hockey players
National Hockey League first-round draft picks
People from North Smithfield, Rhode Island
Piráti Chomutov players
Providence Bruins players
Rochester Americans players
Ross School of Business alumni
San Jose Sharks draft picks
San Jose Sharks players
Mount Saint Charles Academy alumni
AHCA Division I men's ice hockey All-Americans
American expatriate ice hockey players in the Czech Republic
American expatriate ice hockey players in Germany
American expatriate ice hockey players in Finland